The cantons of Strasbourg are administrative divisions of the Bas-Rhin department, in northeastern France. Since the French canton reorganisation which came into effect in March 2015, the city of Strasbourg is subdivided into 6 cantons. Their seat is in Strasbourg.

Cantons

References

Cantons of Bas-Rhin